Ebony Concerto may refer to: 

Ebony Concerto (Taras) by John Taras, a ballet in the repertory of New York City Ballet
Ebony Concerto (Woetzel) by Damian Woetzel, a ballet in the repertory of New York City Ballet
Ebony Concerto (Stravinsky) by Igor Stravinsky